Guy Pearse is an Australian author and former Research Fellow at the Global Change Institute at the University of Queensland. His first book titled High & Dry: John Howard, climate change and the selling of Australia's future was published in 2007. In 2009, Pearse published a critique of the Rudd government's response to climate change in Quarterly Essay 33: Quarry Vision: Coal, Climate Change and the End of the Resources Boom. In 2012, he published Greenwash: Big Brands and Carbon Scams – an analysis of whether the climate-friendly revolution being advertised by large multinationals is real.

Biography 

Guy Pearse worked for various Liberal politicians, as a lobbyist for numerous industries, and as a consultant to the Australian Greenhouse Office. He was speechwriter for Australian Prime Minister John Howard's first environment minister, Robert Hill. While studying at the Kennedy School of Government at Harvard University in the mid 1990s, Pearse worked on the advance staff of then US Vice President Al Gore.

Pearse's doctoral research at the Australian National University focussed on the influence of the carbon lobby on the Howard government. This thesis became the basis for the "Greenhouse Mafia" episode of ABC's Four Corners in February 2006.

See also
Greenhouse Mafia

References

Further reading

External links
Guy Pearse's site with info on: High & Dry: John Howard, Climate Change and the Selling of Australia's Future, Penguin (Australia) 2007; and Quarry Vision: Coal, Climate Change and the End of the Resources Boom, Black Inc (Australia) 2009.
Review of Pearse's book by Australian of the Year, Tim Flannery
Transcript of Guy Pearse's interview with Lateline Business
Extended interview with Pearse by Richard Fidler on ABC's The Conversation Hour.
Guy Pearse Interviewed by Brian Carlton on Triple M's Spoonman Show.
Government's emissions trading plan criticised : ABC Radio National Breakfast

Harvard Kennedy School alumni
Living people
Australian whistleblowers
Place of birth missing (living people)
Year of birth missing (living people)
Non-fiction environmental writers
Australian National University alumni